Karnataka's coastline called Karavali stretches 300 km between Mangalore in Dakshina Kannada district and Karwar in Uttara Kannada district.  The coastline of Karnataka has been along the eastern shore of Arabian Sea.  Karnataka has one major and ten minor ports in this coastal belt.  Kali, Belekeri, Gangavali, Aghanashini Sharavathi, Sharabi, Kollur, Gangolli, Sitanadi, Gurpur and Netravati are the important rivers in this belt which empty into the Arabian sea.  Sea erosion, migration of river mouths, siltation of ports and harbours are some of the problems common to this belt.

Development of ports being a state subject, the Government of Karnataka set up the Department of Ports and Inland Water Transport in 1957.  The Department maintains one major and ten minor ports between Mangalore in the south and Karwar in the North.  The only major port is the New Mangalore Port.  The minor ports are located at Karwar, Old Mangalore, Belekeri, Tadadi, Honnavar, Bhatkal, Kundapur, Hangarakatta, Malpe and Padubidri ports.  Of these, the one at Karwar is the only all-weather port while the rest are riverine fair-weather lighterage ports.

In the light of the economic reforms that the central government implemented in the early nineties, the Karnataka government also has been making serious efforts to improve its port infrastructure.  In 1997, a "Port Policy" was formulated with a view to develop all ports with private participation.  The policy is built around the BOOST (Build-Own-Operate-Share and Transfer) concept and primarily seeks to improve cargo handling capacity.

New Mangalore Port 
New Mangalore Port is a deep-water, all-weather port at Panambur, Mangalore. The New Mangalore Port is the only major port of Karnataka and is currently the seventh largest port in India.[3]

Old Mangalore Port 
The Old Mangalore Port is located to south of New Mangalore Port. It is popularly known by name of Bunder.  The port was used to ferry goods and passengers to Lakshadweep island and Middle East countries. Now fishing has become main activity of this harbour.

Belekeri port 

Belekeri Port is located at binge bay, south of the Kali estuary and 27 km South to Karwar, Uttar Kannada Dist, Karnataka. For now second biggest port after Mangalore Port in Karnataka. Only main advantage is nearer to Hospet and Bellary cities which are major producers of Iron Ore. This port is mainly used for Exporting of Iron Ore. Vessels won't come to shore/berth. Ore is transported to ships in sea through barges. For now three jettys are available for barger loading. Port is not well dredged. Some private companies are operating.

Tadadi  port 
 
This port is situated in the estuary of the Aghanashini river.  The backwaters of the river Aghanashini forms a vast water front at this port and there opportunity to develop this port with modern infrastructure.  The Konkan railway line and N.H. 17 are pass close to the  port area.  Also, N.H. 63 and the proposed Hubli - Ankola railway line and Honnavar Tumkur N.H. 206 are infrastructure for all-round development of Tadadi port.  This port is projected  for  development under the BOOST (Build, Own, Operate, Share, and Transfer) concept through private participation.  Vast area is available for development of the port with negligible rehabilitation problems.  Tadadi port has an effective hinterland of about 2.00 lakhs square metres comprising central and northern parts of Karnataka and some parts of Andhra Pradesh, which are rich in minerals, forests, agricultural, and marine resources.

Honnavar port 
Honnavar port is located at the place where Sharavati river joins Arabian Sea. The port is near to town of Honnavar in Uttara Kannada district. Efforts to make this port for handling of larger ships have not been successful. The National Highway 17 and Honnavar railway station on Konkan Railway route is nearby.

Bhatkal port
This  port  is  well – protected port  on the  bank of sharabhi  river. Vijayanagar empire time this port was used to trade with arabs, Presently  fishing  vessels are utilising  the  facilities of  this port. This port could  be  developed  as a  modern  fishing  harbour  with full-fledged  fish  handling  facilities. The Port is surrounded by hills and river

Kundapura(Gangolli) port
The port is at the confluence of Pancha gangolli river. The port is near the town Gangolli of Kundapura in Udupi district. Even though National Highway 17 and Konkan railway pass near this port, development of this port has not taken place. Considered mainly for fishing

Hangarakatta port
This port is located in Udupi district of Karnataka state. Hangarkatta port is mainly used by fishing boats. The port is banks of Swarna river and Sita river.

Malpe port
Malpe port is situated near town of Udupi. The port is located on confluence of Udyavara river and Arabian Sea. The port mostly handles fishing activities and sometimes cargo also.

Padubidri port 
Padubidri is located in Udupi district of Karnataka state. There are talks of Padubidre port being developed for handling coal required for thermal power generating station being set up in nearby village of Nandikur.

Inland water transport 
No major inland path for water transport in karnataka.

References 
 Karnataka ports introduction
 New Mangalore Port

Ports and harbours of Karnataka